Colombian singer and songwriter Shakira has released 64 music videos, 5 live albums, 8 films, and 4 documentaries.

In 1991, Shakira signed a recording contract with Sony Music Colombia and released her debut album Magia (1991). Three music videos were directed for the album. Only one music video was directed for her second album, Peligro. Shakira has refused to allow the re-release of any videos from her first two albums due to their "immaturity". In 1994, Shakira made her acting debut playing Luisa Maria in the Colombian telenovela El Oasis. Shakira's first major music video was for "Estoy Aquí", directed by Simón Brand, for her third album Pies Descalzos. The video depicts a barn during the various weather seasons, and shows Shakira performing the song, accompanied with a guitar. The following single, "¿Dónde Estás Corazón?", three music videos. Directors for the video included Oscar Azula, Julian Torres, Gustavo Garzón, and Camilo Falcon. Garzón also directed videos for upcoming singles "Pies Descalzos, Sueños Blancos" and "Un Poco de Amor" from the same album, whereas Juan Carlos Martin directed the video for the 1997 single "Se Quiere, Se Mata".

In 2000, Shakira released her first video album, MTV Unplugged. Five videos were directed for Shakira's fourth studio album Dónde Están los Ladrones?. Gustavo Garzón directed videos for "Ciega, Sordomuda", "Inevitable" and "No Creo". Cuban director Emilio Estefan directed the video for "Tú", and Mark Kohr directed "Ojos Así". Austrian film director Francis Lawrence directed both the English and Spanish versions of "Whenever, Wherever", the lead single from her fifth album Laundry Service. The video uses a green screen, and features Shakira surrounded by the earth's natural wonders. The following single, "Underneath Your Clothes" was directed by American photographer Herb Ritts and it was the second to last he directed before his death.

Shakira released two albums in 2005, Fijación Oral, Vol. 1 and Oral Fixation, Vol. 2. Four videos were directed for Fijación Oral, Vol. 1, and three for Oral Fixation, Vol. 2. British director Sophie Muller directed the video for one of Shakira's most successful songs, "Hips Don't Lie", featuring Wyclef Jean. Shakira also made her directing debut, co-directing videos for the singles "Illegal" and "Las de la Intuición", alongside Jaume de Laiguana. In 2006, Shakira starred in the video for her and Beyoncé's collaboration, "Beautiful Liar", which was directed by British director Jake Nava. It was filmed over two days, during the two-week production of B'Day Anthology Video Album. Because of a busy schedule, the production team did not have enough time for the choreography. In 2009, Nava also directed the videos for both the English and Spanish versions of "She Wolf". The two following singles, Did It Again and Did It Again were directed by Sophie Muller, and "Gypsy" was directed by Jaume de Laiguana.

Marcus Raboy directed videos for all versions of "Waka Waka (This Time for Africa)", which was the official song for the 2010 FIFA World Cup. Jaume de Laiguana directed the first three music videos from Shakira's ninth studio album Sale el Sol, and the fourth single, "Addicted to You" was directed by Anthony Mandler. Shakira's tenth studio album, Shakira, spawned five music videos. Joseph Kahn directed the video for "Can't Remember to Forget You", featuring Rihanna, and the solo Spanish version, "Nunca Me Acuerdo de Olvidarte". The music video for "Empire" was directed by Darren Craig, Jonathan Craven and Jeff Nicholas from the Uprising Creative. Four versions of the song "Dare (La La La)" were directed, two by Anthony Mandler and two by Jaume de Laiguana.

Music videos

Video albums

Filmography

Television

Films

See also

 Shakira discography
 List of songs recorded by Shakira
 List of awards and nominations received by Shakira
 List of Shakira concert tours

References

Videographies
Videography